Halgurd (Arabic: هالكورد, Halkurd) is the second highest mountain in Iraq, after Cheekha Dar, and the tallest fully within Iraq. Located in Choman district in Northern Erbil Province, Kurdistan Region, Iraq. Halgurd has an elevation of 3,607 metres.

References

 (ھەڵگورد), Central Kurdish Wikipedia, 19 August 2015.
 

Mountains of Iraq
International mountains of Asia
Mountains of Kurdistan